Munich-Perlach station is a railway station in the Ramersdorf-Perlach borough of Munich, Germany.

References

External links

Munich S-Bahn stations
Perlach
Railway stations in Germany opened in 1904
1904 establishments in Bavaria